Anastasia Pavlyuchenkova was the defending champion and defended her title by defeating Jelena Janković 2–6, 6–2, 6–3 in the final.

Seeds

Qualifying

Draw

Finals

Top half

Bottom half

References
 Main Draw

Monterrey Open - Singles
Monterrey Open